Kronshtadtsky District is a district of the federal city of St. Petersburg, Russia. As of the 2010 Census, its population was 43,005; down from 43,385 recorded in the 2002 Census.

Municipal divisions
Kronshtadtsky District comprises the municipal town of Kronshtadt.

References

Notes

Sources

Districts of Saint Petersburg
